Chloroclystis latifasciata is a species of moth of the family Geometridae. It was described by Joseph de Joannis in 1932. It is found in Mauritius, Réunion, Madagascar.

See also
List of moths of Mauritius
List of moths of Réunion
List of moths of Madagascar

References

External links

latifasciata
Moths described in 1932
Moths of Madagascar
Moths of Mauritius
Moths of Réunion